Mazamorra (from Spanish Arabic  pičmáṭ from Greek  paxamádion, and from the Greek  mâza) is the name for numerous traditional dishes from Iberian Peninsula and Latin America.

Regional variations

Argentina
In Argentina, mazamorra is a traditional dish. It is a dessert with native roots made with white maize, water, sugar, and vanilla. A variant, which is the most consumed in the country, is mazamorra with milk. In this recipe, milk is added to the previous ingredients.

Mazamorra is usually made with the same boiled maize used to make locro.

As with locro, it is common to eat mazamorra on national holidays, like 25 de mayo and independence day.

Colombia

Initially, mazamorra was the stew which fed galeotes (the rowers, almost always forced, in the ships called galeras) and sailors. The dish consisted of any available vegetables, most often peppers, lentils, and chickpeas, cooked together. In central Colombia, there is still a type of vegetable stew with this name.

Today, however, mazamorra is more commonly a corn-based beverage, with different presentations in various parts of the country. For many Colombian speakers, it is simply very-well-cooked peeled corn, also known as peto. Its texture and appearance vary depending on the region, but usually, mazamorra has a white or yellow appearance according to the maize that is used; its texture is generally soft and mushy.

In Antioquia, it often accompanies panela and is a very popular side dish to meals such as bandeja paisa. The drink typically includes maize grains, crushed with mortar and pestle, then soaked in water with soda lye (although the traditional reagent used is fern ash, which contains high amounts of potassium carbonate), and finally cooked until soft.

Mazamorra is very common during lunch and dinnertime at any time of year. The mazamorra is a typical Colombian food that is served as an accompaniment or as a main dish, whether familiar or casual.
It is usually sold as "street food”.
  Usually, the consumer adds the milk and the panela to the mazamorra base.

In Cundinamarca and Boyacá, where the corn is cooked with onions, coriander, garlic, faba beans, potatoes and mashuas, often with pieces of ribs or beef.  This dish is known as  mazamorra chiquita (small mazamorra).

Dominican Republic and Cuba
In the Dominican Republic and Cuba this dish is known as majarete. Corn is cut off the husk, blended with milk, butter, water, sugar, and cornstarch. It is then boiled until thick with cinnamon sticks.

In Cuba raisins, vanilla, and lemon zest can be added. Once cooled the pudding is garnished with nutmeg and cinnamon.

Both countries claim to have originated the dish. Due to migration between the two countries the origin is lost.

In the Dominican Republic when corn is left whole it is known as chaca and cooked rice can be added.

Paraguay
Also known as kaguyjy in Guaraní, Mazamorra in Paraguay is made with the native locro variety of maize. It is one of the most traditional desserts of the country. According with the ingredients added to the cooked corn, the dish is denominated kaguyjy eírare (Honey mazamorra), kaaguyjy kambýre (milk mazamorra) or kaguyjy azucáre (sugar mazamorra). Kaguyjy reached great popularity in Paraguay due to the food scarcity during the Paraguayan War (between 1864 and 1870) as a nutritious substitute for a regular meal.

Peru

Purple Mazamorra in Peru is made with a local variety of maize, purple corn, rich in anthocyanin which gives the mazamorra a deep purple color.  The maize is cooked with pineapple, cinnamon and sweet potato flour. This dish is made specially in October for the celebrations of the Lord of Miracles day 333. This purple corn is also used to make chicha morada, a sweet beverage.
There is also other kind of typical Peruvian Mazamorras, as Maize Starch Mazamorra (Mazamorra de Maicena), and Dark Brown Sugar Mazamorra (Mazamorra de Cochino).

Uruguay
Mazamorra is consumed since colonial times, it was made from crumbled maize that was crumbled by women in mortairs. Mazamorra con leche is a traditional dessert, made of crumbled maize, sugar and milk, and was commonly sold as street food in ancient Montevideo but nowadays is more like an old fashioned comfort food.

Costa Rica
Costa Rican mazamorra is basically a corn porridge, which is made cooking the maize in milk, clove, vanilla, and adding corn starch.

Puerto Rico
Puerto Rican mazamorra, is fresh corn custard. Corn kernels are cut off the cob and boiled with milk and cob until the corn softens. Once soft, the cob is discarded and the corn is put into a blender with the milk. Once made into a paste, the corn is passed through a chinois back into the pot for a second time. The liquid is then cooked with corn starch, butter, coconut cream, evaporated milk, ginger, spices, zest, and sugar. It is then topped with powdered nutmeg and cinnamon. Banana or ripe breadfruit can be blended and added for texture and flavor.

Spain
Cordobense mazamorra is a traditional dish made of almonds, bread, garlic, oil and vinegar.

Not related to maize

 Panama: A local dessert made with the Nance fruit (also known as "Pesada" ("heavy").
 Spain:
 A cold soup similar to salmorejo.  It is made with bread, almonds, garlic, olive oil and vinegar.
 In La Guardia in Toledo Province it is a combination of fried vegetables 
 Peru: Mazamorra de Calabaza is a popular dessert in the Huánuco region, made with pumpkin
 Dominican Republic: Mazamorra means mashed squash.

See also

 Mote (food)
 Atole
 Champurrado
 Corn stew
 List of maize dishes
 List of porridges

References

External links

Recipes for Colombian Mazamorra

Non-alcoholic drinks
Porridges
Colombian cuisine
Peruvian cuisine
Puerto Rican cuisine
Native American cuisine
Maize-based drinks
Maize dishes